John Bedford ( 1720–1791) was an English industrialist.

John Bedford may also refer to:

John Bedford (fl. 1391), MP for Lewes
John Bedford (died 1451), MP for Kingston upon Hull
John Bedford (Wesleyan) (1810–1879), English Wesleyan minister